Boulendor or Boulandor is a settlement in Bignona Department in Ziguinchor Region in Senegal.  In 2015 its population was assessed at 855.

References

External links
PEPAM 

Populated places in the Bignona Department
Arrondissement of Tenghory